The 93rd United States Congress was a meeting of the legislative branch of the United States federal government, composed of the United States Senate and the United States House of Representatives. It met in Washington, D.C., from January 3, 1973, to January 3, 1975, during the last 18 months of Richard Nixon's presidency, and the first 6 months of Gerald Ford's.  This Congress was the first (and, to date, only) Congress with more than two Senate presidents (in this case, three). After the resignation of Spiro Agnew, Gerald Ford was appointed under the authority of the newly ratified 25th Amendment.  Ford became president the next year and Nelson Rockefeller was appointed in his place.  The apportionment of seats in the House of Representatives was based on the 1970 United States census. Both chambers had a Democratic majority.  This is the earliest Congress to feature a member of the 117th Congress, Representative Don Young (R-AK), who served until he died in 2022.

Major events

 January 20, 1973: President Richard Nixon began his second term.
 January 22, 1973: Supreme Court issued abortion decision, Roe v. Wade
 January 27, 1973: Paris Peace Accords signed
 October 10, 1973: Vice President Spiro Agnew resigned
 October 20, 1973: Saturday Night Massacre
 October 30, 1973: Impeachment process against Richard Nixon initiated
 December 6, 1973: Vice President Gerald Ford confirmed and inaugurated
 August 9, 1974: President Richard Nixon resigned. Vice President Gerald Ford became President of the United States.
 November 5, 1974: United States midterm elections: Democrats increased their majorities in both houses
 December 19, 1974: Vice President Nelson Rockefeller confirmed and inaugurated

Major legislation

 July 1, 1973: Case–Church Amendment, title I, 
 August 13, 1973: Federal Aid Highway Act of 1973, title I, 
 September 26, 1973: Rehabilitation Act of 1973, 
 October 1, 1973: Domestic Volunteer Services Act of 1973 (VISTA), 
 October 4, 1973: Oil Pollution Act of 1973, 
 November 3, 1973: Amtrak Improvement Act, 
 November 7, 1973: War Powers Resolution, 
 December 28, 1973: Comprehensive Employment and Training Act, 
 December 28, 1973: Endangered Species Act, 
 December 29, 1973: Health Maintenance Organization Act of 1973, 
 March 7, 1974: Water Resources Development Act of 1974, 
 May 22, 1974: Disaster Relief Act of 1974, 
 July 12, 1974: Congressional Budget and Impoundment Control Act of 1974, 
 July 25, 1974: Legal Services Corporation Act, 
 August 21, 1974: Family Educational Rights and Privacy Act, title V, §513, 
 September 2, 1974: Employee Retirement Income Security Act (ERISA), 
 September 7, 1974: Juvenile Justice and Delinquency Prevention Act of 1974, 
 October 15, 1974: Federal Election Campaign Act, 
 October 28, 1974: Equal Credit Opportunity Act, 
 October 29, 1974: Federal Fire Prevention and Control Act of 1974, 
 November 26, 1974: National Mass Transportation Assistance Act, 
 December 3, 1974: Vietnam Era Veterans' Readjustment Assistance Act, 
 December 16, 1974: Safe Drinking Water Act, 
 December 31, 1974: Privacy Act of 1974, 
 January 2, 1975: An Act to Establish Rules of Evidence for Certain Courts and Proceedings, 
 January 3, 1975: Trade Act of 1974, 
 January 3, 1975: Hazardous Materials Transportation Act, title I, 
 January 4, 1975: Magnuson–Moss Warranty Act, 
 January 4, 1975: Indian Self-Determination and Education Assistance Act of 1975, 
 January 4, 1975: National Health Planning and Resources Development Act,

Hearings
 May 17, 1973: Watergate hearings began (Senate Select Committee on Presidential Campaign Activities)
 May 9, 1974: Hearings on the impeachment of President Nixon began (House Judiciary Committee)

Party summary

Senate

House of Representatives

Leadership

Senate 
 President: Spiro Agnew (R) until October 10, 1973
 Gerald Ford (R) December 6, 1973 – August 9, 1974
Nelson Rockefeller (R) from December 19, 1974
 President pro tempore: James Eastland (D)
 Permanent acting president pro tempore: Lee Metcalf (D)

Majority (Democratic) leadership 
 Majority Leader: Mike Mansfield
 Majority Whip: Robert Byrd
 Democratic Caucus Secretary: Frank Moss

Minority (Republican) leadership 
 Minority Leader: Hugh Scott
 Minority Whip: Robert P. Griffin
 Republican Conference Chairman: Norris Cotton
 Republican Conference Secretary: Wallace F. Bennett
 National Senatorial Committee Chair: Bill Brock
 Policy Committee Chairman: John Tower

House of Representatives 
 Speaker: Carl Albert (D)

Majority (Democratic) leadership 
 Majority Leader: Tip O'Neill
 Majority Whip: John J. McFall
 Democratic Caucus Chairman: Olin E. Teague
 Democratic Caucus Secretary: Leonor Sullivan
 Democratic Campaign Committee Chairman: Wayne Hays

Minority (Republican) leadership 
 Minority Leader: Gerald Ford until December 6, 1973
John Jacob Rhodes from December 7, 1973
 Minority Whip: Leslie C. Arends
 Republican Conference Chairman: John B. Anderson
 Republican Conference Vice-Chairman: Samuel L. Devine
 Republican Conference Secretary: Jack Edwards
 Policy Committee Chairman: Barber Conable
 Republican Campaign Committee Chairman: Robert H. Michel

Caucuses
 Congressional Black Caucus
 House Democratic Caucus
 Senate Democratic Caucus

Members
This list is arranged by chamber, then by state. Senators are listed by class, and representatives are listed by district.
 Skip down to House of Representatives

Senate
Senators are popularly elected statewide every two years, with one-third beginning new six-year terms with each Congress. Preceding the names in the list below are Senate class numbers, which indicate the cycle of their election. In this Congress, Class 1 means their term began in the last Congress, facing re-election in 1976; Class 2 means their term began with this Congress, facing re-election in 1978; and Class 3 means their term ended with this Congress, facing re-election in 1974.

Alabama 

 2. John Sparkman (D)
 3. James Allen (D)

Alaska 

 2. Ted Stevens (R)
 3. Mike Gravel (D)

Arizona 

 1. Paul Fannin (R)
 3. Barry Goldwater (R)

Arkansas 

 2. John L. McClellan (D)
 3. J. William Fulbright (D), until December 31, 1974

California 

 1. John V. Tunney (D)
 3. Alan Cranston (D)

Colorado 

 2. Floyd Haskell (D)
 3. Peter H. Dominick (R)

Connecticut 

 1. Lowell Weicker (R)
 3. Abraham Ribicoff (D)

Delaware 

 1. William Roth (R)
 2. Joe Biden (D)

Florida 

 1. Lawton Chiles (D)
 3. Edward Gurney (R), until December 31, 1974
 Richard Stone (D), from January 1, 1975

Georgia 

 2. Sam Nunn (D)
 3. Herman Talmadge (D)

Hawaii 

 1. Hiram Fong (R)
 3. Daniel Inouye (D)

Idaho 

 2. James A. McClure (R)
 3. Frank Church (D)

Illinois 

 2. Charles H. Percy (R)
 3. Adlai Stevenson III (D)

Indiana 

 1. Vance Hartke (D)
 3. Birch Bayh (D)

Iowa 

 2. Dick Clark (D)
 3. Harold Hughes (D)

Kansas 

 2. James B. Pearson (R)
 3. Bob Dole (R)

Kentucky 

 2. Walter "Dee" Huddleston (D)
 3. Marlow Cook (R), until December 27, 1974
 Wendell Ford (D), from December 28, 1974

Louisiana 

 2. J. Bennett Johnston (D)
 3. Russell B. Long (D)

Maine 

 1. Edmund Muskie (D)
 2. William Hathaway (D)

Maryland 

 1. J. Glenn Beall Jr. (R)
 3. Charles Mathias (R)

Massachusetts 

 1. Ted Kennedy (D)
 2. Edward Brooke (R)

Michigan 

 1. Philip Hart (D)
 2. Robert P. Griffin (R)

Minnesota 

 1. Hubert Humphrey (DFL)
 2. Walter Mondale (DFL)

Mississippi 

 1. John C. Stennis (D)
 2. James Eastland (D)

Missouri 

 1. Stuart Symington (D)
 3. Thomas Eagleton (D)

Montana 

 1. Mike Mansfield (D)
 2. Lee Metcalf (D)

Nebraska 

 1. Roman Hruska (R)
 2. Carl Curtis (R)

Nevada 

 1. Howard Cannon (D)
 3. Alan Bible (D), until December 17, 1974
 Paul Laxalt (R), from December 18, 1974

New Hampshire 

 2. Thomas J. McIntyre (D)
 3. Norris Cotton (R), until December 31, 1974
 Louis C. Wyman (R), from December 31, 1974

New Jersey 

 1. Harrison A. Williams (D)
 2. Clifford P. Case (R)

New Mexico 

 1. Joseph Montoya (D)
 2. Pete Domenici (R)

New York 

 1. James L. Buckley (C)
 3. Jacob Javits (R)

North Carolina 

 2. Jesse Helms (R)
 3. Sam Ervin (D), until December 31, 1974

North Dakota 

 1. Quentin Burdick (D-NPL)
 3. Milton Young (R)

Ohio 

 1. Robert Taft Jr. (R)
 3. William B. Saxbe (R), until January 3, 1974
 Howard Metzenbaum (D),  January 4, 1974 – December 23, 1974
 John Glenn (D), from December 24, 1974

Oklahoma 

 2. Dewey F. Bartlett (R)
 3. Henry Bellmon (R)

Oregon 

 2. Mark Hatfield (R)
 3. Bob Packwood (R)

Pennsylvania 

 1. Hugh Scott (R)
 3. Richard Schweiker (R)

Rhode Island 

 1. John Pastore (D)
 2. Claiborne Pell (D)

South Carolina 

 2. Strom Thurmond (R)
 3. Fritz Hollings (D)

South Dakota 

 2. James Abourezk (D)
 3. George McGovern (D)

Tennessee 

 1. Bill Brock (R)
 2. Howard Baker (R)

Texas 

 1. Lloyd Bentsen (D)
 2. John Tower (R)

Utah 

 1. Frank Moss (D)
 3. Wallace F. Bennett (R), until December 20, 1974
 Jake Garn (R), from December 21, 1974

Vermont 

 1. Robert Stafford (R)
 3. George Aiken (R)

Virginia 

 1. Harry F. Byrd Jr. (I)
 2. William L. Scott (R)

Washington 

 1. Henry M. Jackson (D)
 3. Warren Magnuson (D)

West Virginia 

 1. Robert Byrd (D)
 2. Jennings Randolph (D)

Wisconsin 

 1. William Proxmire (D)
 3. Gaylord Nelson (D)

Wyoming 

 1. Gale W. McGee (D)
 2. Clifford Hansen (R)

House of Representatives
The names of members of the House of Representatives are preceded by their district numbers.

Alabama 

 . Jack Edwards (R)
 . William Louis Dickinson (R)
 . Bill Nichols (D)
 . Tom Bevill (D)
 . Robert E. Jones Jr. (D)
 . John Hall Buchanan Jr. (R)
 . Walter Flowers (D)

Alaska 

 . Don Young (R), from March 6, 1973

Arizona 

 . John Jacob Rhodes (R)
 . Mo Udall (D)
 . Sam Steiger (R)
 . John Bertrand Conlan (R)

Arkansas 

 . William Vollie Alexander Jr. (D)
 . Wilbur Mills (D)
 . John Paul Hammerschmidt (R)
 . Ray Thornton (D)

California 

 . Donald H. Clausen (R)
 . Harold T. Johnson (D)
 . John E. Moss (D)
 . Robert L. Leggett (D)
 . Phillip Burton (D)
 . William S. Mailliard (R), until March 5, 1974
 John Burton (D), from June 4, 1974
 . Ron Dellums (D)
 . Pete Stark (D)
 . Don Edwards (D)
 . Charles Gubser (R), until December 31, 1974
 . Leo Ryan (D)
 . Burt Talcott (R)
 . Charles M. Teague (R), until January 1, 1974
 Robert J. Lagomarsino (R), from March 5, 1974
 . Jerome Waldie (D)
 . John J. McFall (D)
 . B. F. Sisk (D)
 . Pete McCloskey (R)
 . Bob Mathias (R)
 . Chester E. Holifield (D), until December 31, 1974
 . Carlos Moorhead (R)
 . Augustus Hawkins (D)
 . James C. Corman (D)
 . Del M. Clawson (R)
 . John H. Rousselot (R)
 . Charles E. Wiggins (R)
 . Thomas M. Rees (D)
 . Barry Goldwater Jr. (R)
 . Alphonzo E. Bell Jr. (R)
 . George E. Danielson (D)
 . Edward R. Roybal (D)
 . Charles H. Wilson (D)
 . Craig Hosmer (R), until December 31, 1974
 . Jerry Pettis (R)
 . Richard T. Hanna (D), until December 31, 1974
 . Glenn M. Anderson (D)
 . William M. Ketchum (R)
 . Yvonne Brathwaite Burke (D)
 . George Brown Jr. (D)
 . Andrew J. Hinshaw (R)
 . Bob Wilson (R)
 . Lionel Van Deerlin (D)
 . Clair Burgener (R)
 . Victor Veysey (R)

Colorado 

 . Pat Schroeder (D)
 . Donald G. Brotzman (R)
 . Frank Evans (D)
 . James Paul Johnson (R)
 . William L. Armstrong (R)

Connecticut 

 . William R. Cotter (D)
 . Robert H. Steele (R)
 . Robert Giaimo (D)
 . Stewart McKinney (R)
 . Ronald A. Sarasin (R)
 . Ella Grasso (D)

Delaware 

 . Pete du Pont (R)

Florida 

 . Bob Sikes (D)
 . Don Fuqua (D)
 . Charles E. Bennett (D)
 . Bill Chappell (D)
 . Bill Gunter (D)
 . Bill Young (R)
 . Sam Gibbons (D)
 . James A. Haley (D)
 . Louis Frey Jr. (R)
 . Skip Bafalis (R)
 . Paul Rogers (D)
 . J. Herbert Burke (R)
 . William Lehman (D)
 . Claude Pepper (D)
 . Dante Fascell (D)

Georgia 

 . Ronald 'Bo' Ginn (D)
 . Dawson Mathis (D)
 . Jack Brinkley (D)
 . Benjamin B. Blackburn (R)
 . Andrew Young (D)
 . John Flynt (D)
 . John William Davis (D)
 . W. S. Stuckey Jr. (D)
 . Phillip M. Landrum (D)
 . Robert Grier Stephens Jr. (D)

Hawaii 

 . Spark Matsunaga (D)
 . Patsy Mink (D)

Idaho 

 . Steve Symms (R)
 . Orval H. Hansen (R)

Illinois 

 . Ralph Metcalfe (D)
 . Morgan F. Murphy (D)
 . Robert P. Hanrahan (R)
 . Ed Derwinski (R)
 . John C. Kluczynski (D)
 . Harold R. Collier (R)
 . Cardiss Collins (D), from June 5, 1973
 . Dan Rostenkowski (D)
 . Sidney R. Yates (D)
 . Samuel H. Young (R)
 . Frank Annunzio (D)
 . Phil Crane (R)
 . Robert McClory (R)
 . John N. Erlenborn (R)
 . Leslie C. Arends (R), until December 31, 1974
 . John B. Anderson (R)
 . George M. O'Brien (R)
 . Robert H. Michel (R)
 . Tom Railsback (R)
 . Paul Findley (R)
 . Edward Rell Madigan (R)
 . George E. Shipley (D)
 . Melvin Price (D)
 . Kenneth J. Gray (D), until December 31, 1974

Indiana 

 . Ray Madden (D)
 . Earl Landgrebe (R)
 . John Brademas (D)
 . J. Edward Roush (D)
 . Elwood Hillis (R)
 . William G. Bray (R)
 . John T. Myers (R)
 . Roger H. Zion (R)
 . Lee H. Hamilton (D)
 . David W. Dennis (R)
 . William H. Hudnut III (R)

Iowa 

 . Edward Mezvinsky (D)
 . John Culver (D)
 . H. R. Gross (R)
 . Neal Edward Smith (D)
 . William J. Scherle (R)
 . Wiley Mayne (R)

Kansas 

 . Keith Sebelius (R)
 . William R. Roy (D)
 . Larry Winn (R)
 . Garner E. Shriver (R)
 . Joe Skubitz (R)

Kentucky 

 . Frank Stubblefield (D), until December 31, 1974
 . William Natcher (D)
 . Romano Mazzoli (D)
 . Gene Snyder (R)
 . Tim Lee Carter (R)
 . John B. Breckinridge (D)
 . Carl D. Perkins (D)

Louisiana 

 . F. Edward Hébert (D)
 . Hale Boggs (D), until January 3, 1973
 Lindy Boggs (D), from March 20, 1973
 . Dave Treen (R)
 . Joe Waggonner (D)
 . Otto Passman (D)
 . John Rarick (D)
 . John Breaux (D)
 . Gillis William Long (D)

Maine 

 . Peter Kyros (D)
 . William Cohen (R)

Maryland 

 . William Oswald Mills (R), until May 24, 1973
 Robert Bauman (R), from August 21, 1973
 . Clarence Long (D)
 . Paul Sarbanes (D)
 . Marjorie Holt (R)
 . Lawrence Hogan (R)
 . Goodloe Byron (D)
 . Parren Mitchell (D)
 . Gilbert Gude (R)

Massachusetts 

 . Silvio O. Conte (R)
 . Edward Boland (D)
 . Harold Donohue (D), until December 31, 1974
 . Robert Drinan (D)
 . Paul W. Cronin (R)
 . Michael J. Harrington (D)
 . Torbert Macdonald (D)
 . Tip O'Neill (D)
 . Joe Moakley (D)
 . Margaret Heckler (R)
 . James A. Burke (D)
 . Gerry Studds (D)

Michigan 

 . John Conyers (D)
 . Marvin L. Esch (R)
 . Garry E. Brown (R)
 . J. Edward Hutchinson (R)
 . Gerald Ford (R), until December 6, 1973
 Richard Vander Veen (D), from February 18, 1974
 . Charles E. Chamberlain (R), until December 31, 1974
 . Donald Riegle (R), then (D)
 . R. James Harvey (R), until January 31, 1974
 J. Bob Traxler (D), from April 23, 1974
 . Guy Vander Jagt (R)
 . Elford Albin Cederberg (R)
 . Philip Ruppe (R)
 . James G. O'Hara (D)
 . Charles Diggs (D)
 . Lucien Nedzi (D)
 . William D. Ford (D)
 . John Dingell (D)
 . Martha Griffiths (D), until December 31, 1974
 . Robert J. Huber (R)
 . William Broomfield (R)

Minnesota 

 . Al Quie (R)
 . Ancher Nelsen (R), until December 31, 1974
 . Bill Frenzel (R)
 . Joseph Karth (DFL)
 . Donald M. Fraser (DFL)
 . John M. Zwach (R)
 . Robert Bergland (DFL)
 . John Blatnik (DFL), until December 31, 1974

Mississippi 

 . Jamie Whitten (D)
 . David R. Bowen (D)
 . Sonny Montgomery (D)
 . Thad Cochran (R)
 . Trent Lott (R)

Missouri 

 . Bill Clay (D)
 . James W. Symington (D)
 . Leonor Sullivan (D)
 . William J. Randall (D)
 . Richard Walker Bolling (D)
 . Jerry Litton (D)
 . Gene Taylor (R)
 . Richard Howard Ichord Jr. (D)
 . William L. Hungate (D)
 . Bill Burlison (D)

Montana 

 . Richard G. Shoup (R)
 . John Melcher (D)

Nebraska 

 . Charles Thone (R)
 . John Y. McCollister (R)
 . David Martin (R), until December 31, 1974

Nevada 

 . David Towell (R)

New Hampshire 

 . Louis C. Wyman (R), until December 31, 1974
 . James Colgate Cleveland (R)

New Jersey 

 . John E. Hunt (R)
 . Charles W. Sandman Jr. (R)
 . James J. Howard (D)
 . Frank Thompson (D)
 . Peter Frelinghuysen Jr. (R)
 . Edwin B. Forsythe (R)
 . William B. Widnall (R), until December 31, 1974
 . Robert A. Roe (D)
 . Henry Helstoski (D)
 . Peter W. Rodino (D)
 . Joseph Minish (D)
 . Matthew John Rinaldo (R)
 . Joseph J. Maraziti (R)
 . Dominick V. Daniels (D)
 . Edward J. Patten (D)

New Mexico 

 . Manuel Lujan Jr. (R)
 . Harold L. Runnels (D)

New York 

 . Otis G. Pike (D)
 . James R. Grover Jr. (R)
 . Angelo D. Roncallo (R)
 . Norman F. Lent (R)
 . John W. Wydler (R)
 . Lester L. Wolff (D)
 . Joseph P. Addabbo (D)
 . Benjamin Stanley Rosenthal (D)
 . James J. Delaney (D)
 . Mario Biaggi (D)
 . Frank J. Brasco (D)
 . Shirley Chisholm (D)
 . Bertram L. Podell (D)
 . John J. Rooney (D), until December 31, 1974
 . Hugh Carey (D), until December 31, 1974
 . Elizabeth Holtzman (D)
 . John M. Murphy (D)
 . Ed Koch (D)
 . Charles Rangel (D)
 . Bella Abzug (D)
 . Herman Badillo (D)
 . Jonathan Brewster Bingham (D)
 . Peter A. Peyser (R)
 . Ogden Reid (D)
 . Hamilton Fish IV (R)
 . Benjamin Gilman (R)
 . Howard W. Robison (R)
 . Samuel S. Stratton (D)
 . Carleton J. King (R), until December 31, 1974
 . Robert C. McEwen (R)
 . Donald J. Mitchell (R)
 . James M. Hanley (D)
 . William F. Walsh (R)
 . Frank Horton (R)
 . Barber Conable (R)
 . Henry P. Smith III (R)
 . Thaddeus J. Dulski (D), until December 31, 1974
 . Jack Kemp (R)
 . James F. Hastings (R)

North Carolina 

 . Walter B. Jones Sr. (D)
 . Lawrence H. Fountain (D)
 . David N. Henderson (D)
 . Ike Franklin Andrews (D)
 . Wilmer Mizell (R)
 . L. Richardson Preyer (D)
 . Charlie Rose (D)
 . Earl B. Ruth (R)
 . James G. Martin (R)
 . Jim Broyhill (R)
 . Roy A. Taylor (D)

North Dakota 

 . Mark Andrews (R)

Ohio 

 . William J. Keating (R), until January 3, 1974
 Tom Luken (D), from March 5, 1974
 . Donald D. Clancy (R)
 . Charles W. Whalen Jr. (R)
 . Tennyson Guyer (R)
 . Del Latta (R)
 . Bill Harsha (R)
 . Bud Brown (R)
 . Walter E. Powell (R)
 . Thomas L. Ashley (D)
 . Clarence E. Miller (R)
 . J. William Stanton (R)
 . Samuel L. Devine (R)
 . Charles Adams Mosher (R)
 . John F. Seiberling (D)
 . Chalmers Wylie (R)
 . Ralph Regula (R)
 . John M. Ashbrook (R)
 . Wayne Hays (D)
 . Charles J. Carney (D)
 . James V. Stanton (D)
 . Louis Stokes (D)
 . Charles Vanik (D)
 . William Edwin Minshall Jr. (R), until December 31, 1974

Oklahoma 

 . James R. Jones (D)
 . Clem McSpadden (D)
 . Carl Albert (D)
 . Tom Steed (D)
 . John Jarman (D)
 . John Newbold Camp (R)

Oregon 

 . Wendell Wyatt (R)
 . Al Ullman (D)
 . Edith Green (D), until December 31, 1974
 . John R. Dellenback (R)

Pennsylvania 

 . William A. Barrett (D)
 . Robert N. C. Nix Sr. (D)
 . William J. Green III (D)
 . Joshua Eilberg (D)
 . John H. Ware III (R)
 . Gus Yatron (D)
 . Lawrence G. Williams (R)
 . Edward G. Biester Jr. (R)
 . Bud Shuster (R)
 . Joseph M. McDade (R)
 . Dan Flood (D)
 . John P. Saylor (R), until October 28, 1973
 John Murtha (D), from February 5, 1974
 . Lawrence Coughlin (R)
 . William S. Moorhead (D)
 . Fred B. Rooney (D)
 . Edwin Duing Eshleman (R)
 . Herman T. Schneebeli (R)
 . John Heinz (R)
 . George Atlee Goodling (R)
 . Joseph M. Gaydos (D)
 . John Herman Dent (D)
 . Thomas E. Morgan (D)
 . Albert W. Johnson (R)
 . Joseph P. Vigorito (D)
 . Frank M. Clark (D), until December 31, 1974

Rhode Island 

 . Fernand St. Germain (D)
 . Robert Tiernan (D)

South Carolina 

 . Mendel Jackson Davis (D)
 . Floyd Spence (R)
 . William Jennings Bryan Dorn (D), until December 31, 1974
 . James Mann (D)
 . Thomas S. Gettys (D), until December 31, 1974
 . Edward Lunn Young (R)

South Dakota 

 . Frank E. Denholm (D)
 . James Abdnor (R)

Tennessee 

 . Jimmy Quillen (R)
 . John Duncan Sr. (R)
 . LaMar Baker (R)
 . Joe L. Evins (D)
 . Richard Fulton (D)
 . Robin Beard (R)
 . Ed Jones (D)
 . Dan Kuykendall (R)

Texas 

 . Wright Patman (D)
 . Charlie Wilson (D)
 . James M. Collins (R)
 . Ray Roberts (D)
 . Alan Steelman (R)
 . Olin E. Teague (D)
 . Bill Archer (R)
 . Robert C. Eckhardt (D)
 . Jack Brooks (D)
 . J. J. Pickle (D)
 . William R. Poage (D)
 . Jim Wright (D)
 . Bob Price (R)
 . John Andrew Young (D)
 . Kika de la Garza (D)
 . Richard Crawford White (D)
 . Omar Burleson (D)
 . Barbara Jordan (D)
 . George H. Mahon (D)
 . Henry B. González (D)
 . O. C. Fisher (D), until December 31, 1974
 . Robert R. Casey (D)
 . Abraham Kazen (D)
 . Dale Milford (D)

Utah 

 . K. Gunn McKay (D)
 . Wayne Owens (D)

Vermont 

 . Richard W. Mallary (R)

Virginia 

 . Thomas N. Downing (D)
 . G. William Whitehurst (R)
 . David E. Satterfield III (D)
 . Robert Daniel (R)
 . Dan Daniel (D)
 . M. Caldwell Butler (R)
 . J. Kenneth Robinson (R)
 . Stanford Parris (R)
 . William C. Wampler (R)
 . Joel Broyhill (R), until December 31, 1974

Washington 

 . Joel Pritchard (R)
 . Lloyd Meeds (D)
 . Julia Butler Hansen (D), until December 31, 1974
 . Mike McCormack (D)
 . Tom Foley (D)
 . Floyd Hicks (D)
 . Brock Adams (D)

West Virginia 

 . Bob Mollohan (D)
 . Harley Orrin Staggers (D)
 . John M. Slack (D)
 . Ken Hechler (D)

Wisconsin 

 . Les Aspin (D)
 . Robert Kastenmeier (D)
 . Vernon Wallace Thomson (R), until December 31, 1974
 . Clement J. Zablocki (D)
 . Henry S. Reuss (D)
 . William A. Steiger (R)
 . Dave Obey (D)
 . Harold Vernon Froehlich (R)
 . Glenn Robert Davis (R), until December 31, 1974

Wyoming 

 . Teno Roncalio (D)

Non-voting members 
 . Walter Fauntroy (D)
 . Antonio Borja Won Pat (D)
 . Jaime Benítez Rexach (Resident Commissioner) (PPD)
 . Ron de Lugo (D)

Changes in membership

Senate

|-
| Ohio(3)
|  | William B. Saxbe (R)
| Resigned January 3, 1974, to become Attorney General.Successor appointed January 4, 1974 to finish the term.
|  | Howard Metzenbaum (D)
| January 4, 1974

|-
| Nevada(3) 
|  | Alan Bible (D)
| Resigned December 17, 1974, to give successor preferential seniority.Successor appointed December 18, 1974, having already been elected to the next term.
|  | Paul Laxalt (R)
| December 18, 1974

|-
| Utah(3)
|  | Wallace F. Bennett (R)
| Resigned December 20, 1974, to give successor preferential seniority.Successor appointed December 21, 1974, having already been elected to the next term.
|  | Jake Garn (R)
| December 21, 1974

|-
| Ohio(3)
|  | Howard Metzenbaum (D)
| Resigned December 23, 1974, to give successor preferential seniority.Successor appointed December 24, 1974, having already been elected to the next term.
|  | John Glenn (D)
| December 24, 1974

|-
| Kentucky(3)
|  | Marlow Cook (R)
| Resigned December 27, 1974, to give successor preferential seniority.Successor appointed December 28, 1974, having already been elected to the next term.
|  | Wendell Ford (D)
| December 28, 1974

|-
| New Hampshire(3)
|  | Norris Cotton (R)
| Resigned December 31, 1974, to give successor preferential seniority.Successor appointed December 31, 1974, having already been elected to the next term.
|  | Louis C. Wyman (R)
| December 31, 1974

|-
| Florida(3)
|  | Edward Gurney (R)
| Resigned December 31, 1974, in an influence peddling scandal.Successor appointed January 1, 1975, having already been elected to the next term.
|  | Richard Stone (D)
| January 1, 1975

|-
| Arkansas(3)
|  | J. William Fulbright (D)
| Resigned December 31, 1974.Successor began next term.
| Vacant
| Not filled this Congress

|-
| North Carolina(3)
|  | Sam Ervin (D)
| Resigned December 31, 1974.Successor began next term.
| Vacant
| Not filled this Congress

|}

House of Representatives
There were three deaths before this Congress began.

|-
| 
| Vacant
| style="font-size:80%" | Rep. George W. Collins (D) died during previous congress.
|  | Cardiss Collins (D)
| June 5, 1973
|-
| 
| Vacant
| style="font-size:80%" | Nick Begich (D) and Hale Boggs (D) were lost in a plane crash, and the estate of Rep. Begich was issued a presumptive death certificate from the State of Alaska during previous congress.  Both were also declared dead pursuant to H. R. Res. 1 issued January 3, 1973.
|  | Don Young (R)
| nowrap | March 6, 1973
|- 
| 
|  | Hale Boggs (D)
| style="font-size:80%" | Nick Begich (D) and Hale Boggs (D) were lost in a plane crash during previous congress. Both were declared dead pursuant to H. R. Res. 1 issued January 3, 1973.
|  | Lindy Boggs (D)
| March 20, 1973
|- 
| 
|  | Donald Riegle (R)
| style="font-size:80%" | Switched party affiliation.
|  | Donald Riegle (D)
| February 27, 1973
|- 
| 
|  nowrap| William Oswald Mills (R)
| style="font-size:80%" | Committed suicide May 24, 1973.
|  nowrap | Robert Bauman (R)
| August 21, 1973
|- 
| nowrap | 
|  | John P. Saylor (R)
| style="font-size:80%" | Died October 28, 1973.
|  | John Murtha (D)
| nowrap | February 5, 1974
|- 
| 
|  | Gerald Ford (R)
| style="font-size:80%" | Resigned December 6, 1973, to become vice president.
|  | Richard Vander Veen (D)
| February 18, 1974
|-
| 
|  nowrap | Charles M. Teague (R)
| style="font-size:80%" | Died January 1, 1974.
|  nowrap | Robert J. Lagomarsino (R)
| March 5, 1974
|- 
| 
|  | William J. Keating (R)
| style="font-size:80%" | Resigned January 3, 1974.
|  | Tom Luken (D)
| March 5, 1974
|-
| 
|  | R. James Harvey (R)
| style="font-size:80%" | Resigned January 31, 1974, after being appointed as a judge of the US District Court of the Eastern District of Michigan.
|  | J. Bob Traxler (D)
| April 23, 1974
|-
| 
|  | William S. Mailliard (R)
| style="font-size:80%" | Resigned March 5, 1974.
|  | John Burton (D)
| June 4, 1974
|-
| 
|  | Charles Gubser (R)
| style="font-size:80%" | Resigned December 31, 1974.
| colspan=2 rowspan=28| Remained vacant until next Congress
|-
| 
|  | Chester E. Holifield (D)
| style="font-size:80%" | Resigned December 31, 1974.
|-
| 
|  | Craig Hosmer (R)
| style="font-size:80%" | Resigned December 31, 1974.
|-
| 
|  | Richard T. Hanna (D)
| style="font-size:80%" | Resigned December 31, 1974.
|-
| 
|  | Leslie C. Arends (R)
| style="font-size:80%" | Resigned December 31, 1974.
|-
| 
|  | Kenneth J. Gray (D)
| style="font-size:80%" | Resigned December 31, 1974.
|-
| 
|  | Frank Stubblefield (D)
| style="font-size:80%" | Resigned December 31, 1974.
|-
| 
|  | Harold Donohue (D)
| style="font-size:80%" | Resigned December 31, 1974.
|-
| 
|  | Charles E. Chamberlain (R)
| style="font-size:80%" | Resigned December 31, 1974.
|-
| 
|  | Martha Griffiths (D)
| style="font-size:80%" | Resigned December 31, 1974.
|-
| 
|  | Ancher Nelsen (R)
| style="font-size:80%" | Resigned December 31, 1974.
|-
| 
|  | John Blatnik (DFL)
| style="font-size:80%" | Resigned December 31, 1974.
|-
| 
|  | David Martin (R)
| style="font-size:80%" | Resigned December 31, 1974.
|-
| 
|  | Louis C. Wyman (R)
| style="font-size:80%" | Resigned December 31, 1974, after being appointed to the U.S. Senate.
|-
| 
|  | William B. Widnall (R)
| style="font-size:80%" | Resigned December 31, 1974.
|-
| 
|  | John J. Rooney (D)
| style="font-size:80%" | Resigned December 31, 1974.
|-
| 
|  | Hugh Carey (D)
| style="font-size:80%" | Resigned December 31, 1974.
|-
| 
|  | Carleton J. King (R)
| style="font-size:80%" | Resigned December 31, 1974.
|-
| 
|  | Thaddeus J. Dulski (D)
| style="font-size:80%" | Resigned December 31, 1974.
|-
| 
|  | William Edwin Minshall Jr. (R)
| style="font-size:80%" | Resigned December 31, 1974.
|-
| 
|  | Edith Green (D)
| style="font-size:80%" | Resigned December 31, 1974.
|-
| 
|  | Frank M. Clark (D)
| style="font-size:80%" | Resigned December 31, 1974.
|-
| 
|  | William Jennings Bryan Dorn (D)
| style="font-size:80%" | Resigned December 31, 1974.
|-
| 
|  | Thomas S. Gettys (D)
| style="font-size:80%" | Resigned December 31, 1974.
|-
| 
|  | O. C. Fisher (D)
| style="font-size:80%" | Resigned December 31, 1974.
|-
| 
|  | Joel Broyhill (R)
| style="font-size:80%" | Resigned December 31, 1974, after being defeated for re-election.
|-
| 
|  | Julia Butler Hansen (D)
| style="font-size:80%" | Resigned December 31, 1974.
|-
| 
|  | Vernon Wallace Thomson (R)
| style="font-size:80%" | Resigned December 31, 1974.
|-
| 
|  | Glenn Robert Davis (R)
| style="font-size:80%" | Resigned December 31, 1974 .
|}

Committees

Senate 

 Aging (Special) (Chair: Frank Church)
 Aeronautical and Space Sciences (Chair: Frank Moss; Ranking Member: Barry Goldwater)
 Agriculture and Forestry (Chair: William R. Poage; Ranking Member: Carl T. Curtis)
 Environment, Soil Conservation and Forestry (Chair: James Eastland; Ranking Member: Jesse Helms)
 Agriculture Credit and Rural Electrification (Chair: George McGovern; Ranking Member: George D. Aiken)
 Agricultural Production, Marketing and Stabilization of Prices (Chair: Walter "Dee" Huddleston; Ranking Member: Milton R. Young)
 Agricultural Research and General Legislation (Chair: James Allen; Ranking Member: Bob Dole)
 Rural Development (Chair: Dick Clark; Ranking Member: Carl T. Curtis)
 Foreign Agricultural Policy (Chair: Hubert Humphrey; Ranking Member: Henry Bellmon)
 Appropriations (Chair: John L. McClellan; Ranking Member: Milton Young)
 Agriculture, Environmental and Consumer Protection (Chair: Gale W. McGee; Ranking Member: Hiram L. Fong)
 Defense (Chair: John L. McClellan; Ranking Member: Milton R. Young)
 Intelligence Operations (Chair: John L. McClellan; Ranking Member: Milton R. Young)
 District of Columbia (Chair: Birch Bayh; Ranking Member: Charles Mathias)
 Foreign Operations (Chair: Daniel Inouye; Ranking Member: Edward W. Brooke)
 Housing and Urban Development, Space, Science and Veterans (Chair: William Proxmire; Ranking Member: Charles Mathias)
 Interior (Chair: Alan Bible; Ranking Member: Ted Stevens)
 Labor, Health, Education and Welfare (Chair: Warren Magnuson; Ranking Member: Norris Cotton)
 Legislative (Chair: Fritz Hollings; Ranking Member: Norris Cotton)
 Military Construction (Chair: Mike Mansfield; Ranking Member: Richard S. Schweiker)
 Public Works, AEC (Chair: John C. Stennis; Ranking Member: Mark O. Hatfield)
 State, Justice, Commerce and the Judiciary (Chair: John Pastore; Ranking Member: Roman L. Hruska)
 Transportation (Chair: Robert Byrd; Ranking Member: Clifford P. Case)
 Treasury, U.S. Postal Service and General Government (Chair: Joseph Montoya; Ranking Member: Henry Bellmon)
 Armed Services (Chair: John C. Stennis; Ranking Member: Strom Thurmond)
 Central Intelligence (Chair: John C. Stennis; Ranking Member: Peter H. Dominick)
 Preparedness Investigating (Chair: John C. Stennis; Ranking Member: Strom Thurmond)
 National Stockfile and Naval Petroleum Reserves (Chair: Howard Cannon; Ranking Member: William L. Scott)
 Status of Forces (Chair: Sam Ervin; Ranking Member: William L. Scott)
 Military Construction Authorization (Chair: Stuart Symington; Ranking Member: John Tower)
 Arms Control (Chair: Henry M. Jackson; Ranking Member: Barry Goldwater)
 Nuclear Test Ban Treaty Safeguards (Chair: Henry M. Jackson; Ranking Member: William B. Saxbe)
 Tactical Air Power (Chair: Howard Cannon; Ranking Member: Barry Goldwater)
 Research and Development (Chair: Thomas J. McIntyre; Ranking Member: Peter H. Dominick)
 General Legislation (Chair: Harry F. Byrd Jr.; Ranking Member: William B. Saxbe)
 Reprograming of Funds (Chair: John C. Stennis; Ranking Member: John G. Tower)
 Drug Abuse in the Military (Chair: Harold Hughes; Ranking Member: Peter H. Dominick)
 Banking, Housing and Urban Affairs (Chair: John Sparkman; Ranking Member: John G. Tower)
 Consumer Credit (Chair: William Proxmire; Ranking Member: Bill Brock)
 Financial Institutions (Chair: John C. Stennis; Ranking Member: Wallace F. Bennett)
 Housing (Chair: John J. Sparkman; Ranking Member: John G. Tower)
 International Finance (Chair: Adlai Stevenson III; Ranking Member: Bob Packwood)
 Production and Stabilization (Chair: J. Bennett Johnston; Ranking Member: Robert Taft Jr.)
 Securities (Chair: Harrison A. Williams; Ranking Member: Edward W. Brooke)
 Small Business (Chair: Alan Cranston; Ranking Member: Lowell P. Weicker)
 Commerce (Chair: Warren Magnuson; Ranking Member: Norris Cotton)
 Aviation (Chair: Howard Cannon; Ranking Member: Norris Cotton)
 Communications (Chair: Frank Moss; Ranking Member: Howard H. Baker Jr.)
 Consumer (Chair: Frank Moss; Ranking Member: Marlow W. Cook)
 Environment (Chair: Philip Hart; Ranking Member: Marlow W. Cook)
 Foreign Commerce and Tourism (Chair: Daniel Inouye; Ranking Member: Robert P. Griffin)
 Merchant Marine (Chair: Russell B. Long; Ranking Member: J. Glenn Beall Jr.)
 Oceans and Atmosphere (Chair: Fritz Hollings; Ranking Member: Ted Stevens)
 Surface and Transportation (Chair: Vance Hartke; Ranking Member: James B. Pearson)
 District of Columbia (Chair: Thomas Eagleton; Ranking Member: Charles Mathias)
 Business, Commerce and Judiciary (Chair: Adlai Stevenson III; Ranking Member: Pete V. Domenici)
 Fiscal Affairs (Chair: Thomas Eagleton; Ranking Member: Dewey F. Bartlett)
 Public Health, Education, Welfare and Safety (Chair: John V. Tunney; Ranking Member: Charles Mathias)
 Finance (Chair: Abraham Ribicoff; Ranking Member: Wallace F. Bennett)
 International Trade (Chair: Abraham Ribicoff; Ranking Member: Paul Fannin)
 Health (Chair: Herman Talmadge; Ranking Member: Clifford P. Hansen)
 Private Pension Plans (Chair: Gaylord Nelson; Ranking Member: Carl T. Curtis)
 State Taxation of Interstate Commerce (Chair: Walter Mondale; Ranking Member: Clifford P. Hansen)
 Foundations (Chair: Vance Hartke; Ranking Member: Carl T. Curtis)
 International Finance and Resource (Chair: Harry F. Byrd Jr.; Ranking Member: Bob Dole)
 Foreign Relations (Chair: J. William Fulbright; Ranking Member: George D. Aiken)
 Near Eastern Affairs (Chair: J. William Fulbright; Ranking Member: George D. Aiken)
 European Affairs (Chair: John Sparkman; Ranking Member: Clifford P. Case)
 Far Eastern Affairs (Chair: Mike Mansfield; Ranking Member: George D. Aiken)
 Oceans and International Environment (Chair: Claiborne Pell; Ranking Member: Clifford P. Case)
 Western Hemisphere Affairs (Chair: Gale W. McGee; Ranking Member: George D. Aiken)
 Arms Control, International Law and Organization (Chair: Edmund Muskie; Ranking Member: Clifford P. Case)
 South Asian Affairs (Chair: George McGovern; Ranking Member: Charles H. Percy)
 African Affairs (Chair: Hubert Humphrey; Ranking Member: James B. Pearson)
 U.S. Security Agreements and Commitments Aboard (Chair: Stuart Symington; Ranking Member: George D. Aiken)
 Multinational Corporations (Chair: Frank Church; Ranking Member: Frank Church)
 Government Operations (Chair: Sam Ervin; Ranking Member: Charles H. Percy)
 Permanent Investigations (Chair: Henry M. Jackson; Ranking Member: Charles H. Percy)
 Intergovernmental Relations (Chair: Edmund Muskie; Ranking Member: Edward J. Gurney)
 Reorganization, Research and International Organizations (Chair: Abraham Ribicoff; Ranking Member: Jacob K. Javits)
 Budgeting, Management and Expenditures (Chair: Lee Metcalf; Ranking Member: William B. Saxbe)
 Surplus Property (Ad Hoc) (Chair: James Allen; Ranking Member: Edward J. Gurney)
 Inpoundment of Funds (Ad Hoc) (Chair: Lawton Chiles; Ranking Member: Charles H. Percy)
 Procurement (Ad Hoc) (Chair: Lawton Chiles; Ranking Member: William V. Roth Jr.)
 Interior and Insular Affairs (Chair: Henry M. Jackson; Ranking Member: Paul J. Fannin)
 Indian Affairs (Chair: James Abourezk; Ranking Member: Dewey F. Bartlett)
 Minerals, Materials and Fuels (Chair: Lee Metcalf; Ranking Member: James L. Buckley)
 Parks and Recreation (Chair: Alan Bible; Ranking Member: Clifford P. Hansen)
 Public Lands (Chair: Floyd Haskell; Ranking Member: James A. McClure)
 Territories and Insular Affairs (Chair: J. Bennett Johnston; Ranking Member: Paul J. Fannin)
 Water and Power Resources (Chair: Frank Church; Ranking Member: Mark O. Hatfield)
 Judiciary (Chair: James Eastland; Ranking Member: Roman L. Hruska)
 Administrative Practice and Procedure (Chair: Ted Kennedy; Ranking Member: Strom Thurmond)
 Antitrust Monopoly (Chair: Philip Hart; Ranking Member: Roman L. Hruska)
 Constitutional Amendments (Chair: Birch Bayh; Ranking Member: Marlow W. Cook)
 Constitutional Rights (Chair: Sam Ervin; Ranking Member: Edward J. Gurney)
 Criminal Laws and Procedures (Chair: John L. McClellan; Ranking Member: Roman L. Hruska)
 FBI Oversight (Chair: James O. Eastland; Ranking Member: Roman L. Hruska)
 Federal Charters, Holidays and Celebrations (Chair: James Eastland; Ranking Member: John L. McClellan)
 Immigration and Naturalization (Chair: James Eastland; Ranking Member: Hiram L. Fong)
 Improvements in Judicial Machinery (Chair: Quentin Burdick; Ranking Member: Roman Hruska)
 Internal Security (Chair: James Eastland; Ranking Member: Hugh Scott)
 Juvenile Delinquency (Chair: Birch Bayh; Ranking Member: Marlow Cook)
 Patents, Trademarks and Copyrights (Chair: John L. McClellan; Ranking Member: Hugh Scott)
 Penitentiaries (Chair: Quentin Burdick; Ranking Member: Marlow W. Cook)
 Rufugees and Escapees (Chair: Ted Kennedy; Ranking Member: Hiram L. Fong)
 Revision and Codification (Chair: Sam Ervin; Ranking Member: Hugh Scott)
 Separation of Powers (Chair: Sam Ervin; Ranking Member: Charles Mathias)
 Labor and Public Welfare (Chair: Harrison A. Williams; Ranking Member: Jacob K. Javits)
 Labor (Chair: Harrison A. Williams; Ranking Member: Jacob K. Javits)
 Handicapped Workers (Chair: Jennings Randolph; Ranking Member: Robert T. Stafford)
 Education (Chair: Claiborne Pell; Ranking Member: Peter H. Dominick)
 Health (Chair: Ted Kennedy; Ranking Member: Richard S. Schweiker)
 Employment, Poverty and Migratory Labor (Chair: Gaylord Nelson; Ranking Member: Robert Taft Jr.)
 Children and Youth (Chair: Walter Mondale; Ranking Member: Robert Taft Jr.)
 Aging (Chair: Thomas Eagleton; Ranking Member: J. Glenn Beall Jr.)
 Railroad Retirement (Chair: William Hathaway; Ranking Member: Richard S. Schweiker)
 Alcoholism and Narcotics (Chair: Harold Hughes; Ranking Member: Richard S. Schweiker)
 Arts and Humanities (Chair: Claiborne Pell; Ranking Member: Jacob K. Javits)
 National Science Foundation (Chair: Ted Kennedy; Ranking Member: Peter H. Dominick)
 Human Resources (Chair: Alan Cranston; Ranking Member: J. Glenn Beall Jr.)
 Nutrition and Human Needs (Select) (Chair: George McGovern)
 Post Office and Civil Service (Chair: Gale W. McGee; Ranking Member: Hiram L. Fong)
 Civil Service Policies and Practices (Chair: Jennings Randolph; Ranking Member: Henry Bellmon)
 Compensation and Employment Benefits (Chair: Quentin Burdick; Ranking Member: Ted Stevens)
 Postal Operations (Chair: Fritz Hollings; Ranking Member: William B. Saxbe)
 Presidential Campaign Activities (Select) (Chair: Sam J. Ervin Jr.)
 Public Works (Chair: Jennings Randolph; Ranking Member: Howard H. Baker Jr.)
 Air and Water Pollution (Chair: Edmund Muskie; Ranking Member: James L. Buckley)
 Economic Development (Chair: Joseph Montoya; Ranking Member: James A. McClure)
 Water Resources (Chair: Mike Gravel; Ranking Member: William L. Scott)
 Roads (Chair: Lloyd Bentsen; Ranking Member: Robert T. Stafford)
 Disaster Relief (Chair: Quentin Burdick; Ranking Member: Pete Domenici)
 Buildings and Grounds (Chair: Dick Clark; Ranking Member: William L. Scott)
 Rules and Administration (Chair: Howard Cannon; Ranking Member: Marlow W. Cook)
 Standing Rules of the Senate (Chair: Robert Byrd; Ranking Member: Robert P. Griffin)
 Privileges and Elections (Chair: Claiborne Pell; Ranking Member: Mark O. Hatfield)
 Printing (Chair: Howard Cannon; Ranking Member: Hugh Scott)
 Library (Chair: Howard Cannon; Ranking Member: Mark O. Hatfield)
 Smithsonian Institution (Chair: James Allen; Ranking Member: Marlow W. Cook)
 Restaurant (Chair: James Allen; Ranking Member: Marlow W. Cook)
 Computer Services (Chair: Howard Cannon; Ranking Member: Mark O. Hatfield)
 Secret and Confidential Government Documents (Special)
 Small Business (Select) (Chair: Alan Bible)
 Standards and Conduct (Select) (Chair: Frank Church)
 Termination of the National Emergency (Special) (Chair: Frank Church)
 Veterans' Affairs (Chair: Vance Hartke; Ranking Member: Clifford P. Hansen)
 Housing and Insurance (Chair: Harold Hughes; Ranking Member: James A. McClure)
 Readjustment, Education and Employment (Chair: Vance Hartke; Ranking Member: Robert T. Stafford)
 Health and Hospitals (Chair: Alan Cranston; Ranking Member: Strom Thurmond)
 Compensation and Pensions (Chair: Herman Talmadge; Ranking Member: Clifford P. Hansen)
 Whole

House of Representatives 

 Agriculture (Chair: William R. Poage; Ranking Member: Charles M. Teague)
 Cotton (Chair: B. F. Sisk; Ranking Member: Robert B. Mathias)
 Dairy and Poultry (Chair: Ed Jones; Ranking Member: William C. Wampler)
 Forests (Chair: John Rarick; Ranking Member: George A. Goodling)
 Livestock and Grains (Chair: Tom Foley; Ranking Member: Wiley Mayne)
 Oilseeds and Rice (Chair: Walter B. Jones Sr.; Ranking Member: William C. Wampler)
 Tobacco (Chair: Frank Stubblefield; Ranking Member: Wilmer Mizell)
 Conservation and Credit (Chair: William R. Poage; Ranking Member: John M. Zwach)
 Domestic Marketing and Consumer Relations (Chair: Joseph P. Vigorito; Ranking Member: George A. Goodling)
 Department Operations (Chair: Kika de la Garza; Ranking Member: Bob Price)
 Family Farms and Rural Development (Chair: William Vollie Alexander Jr.; Ranking Member: Keith G. Sebelius)
 Appropriations (Chair: George H. Mahon; Ranking Member: Elford A. Cederberg)
 Agriculture, Environmental and Consumer Protection (Chair: Jamie Whitten; Ranking Member: Mark Andrews)
 Defense (Chair: George H. Mahon; Ranking Member: William E. Minshall)
 District of Columbia (Chair: William Natcher; Ranking Member: John T. Myers)
 Foreign Operations (Chair: Otto Passman; Ranking Member: Garner E. Shriver)
 Housing and Urban Development/Space, Science and Veterans (Chair: Edward Boland; Ranking Member: Burt L. Talcott)
 Interior (Chair: Julia Butler Hansen; Ranking Member: Joseph M. McDade)
 Labor, Health, Education and Welfare (Chair: Dan Flood; Ranking Member: Robert H. Michel)
 Legislative (Chair: Robert R. Casey; Ranking Member: Louis C. Wyman)
 Military Construction (Chair: Bob Sikes; Ranking Member: Robert C. McEwen)
 Public Works (Chair: Joe L. Evins; Ranking Member: Glenn Robert Davis)
 State, Justice, Commerce and Judiciary (Chair: John J. Rooney; Ranking Member: Elford A. Cederberg)
 Transportation (Chair: John J. Rooney; Ranking Member: Silvio O. Conte)
 Treasury, Postal Service and General Government (Chair: Tom Steed; Ranking Member: Howard W. Robison)
 Armed Services (Chair: F. Edward Hébert; Ranking Member: William G. Bray)
 Subcommittee No.#1 (Chair: Melvin Price; Ranking Member: Charles S. Gubser)
 Subcommittee No.#2 (Chair: O. C. Fisher; Ranking Member: William L. Dickinson)
 Subcommittee No.#3 (Chair: Charles E. Bennett; Ranking Member: Bob Wilson)
 Subcommittee No.#4 (Chair: Samuel S. Stratton; Ranking Member: John E. Hunt)
 Subcommittee No.#5 (Chair: Otis G. Pike; Ranking Member: Carleton J. King)
 Intelligence (Chair: Lucien Nedzi; Ranking Member: William G. Bray)
 Human Relations (Chair: Floyd Hicks; Ranking Member: John E. Hunt)
 Armed Services Investigation (Chair: F. Edward Hébert; Ranking Member: Leslie C. Arends)
 Banking and Currency (Chair: Wright Patman; Ranking Member: William B. Widnall)
 Domestic Finance (Chair: Wright Patman; Ranking Member: Phil Crane)
 Housing (Chair: William A. Barrett; Ranking Member: William B. Widnall) 
 Consumer Affairs (Chair: Leonor Sullivan; Ranking Member: Chalmers P. Wylie)
 International Trade (Chair: Thomas L. Ashley; Ranking Member: Benjamin B. Blackburn)
 Small Business (Chair: Robert Grier Stephens Jr.; Ranking Member: J. William Stanton)
 Bank Supervision and Insurance (Chair: Fernand St. Germain; Ranking Member: John H. Rousselot)
 International Finance (Chair: Henry B. González; Ranking Member: Albert W. Johnson)
 Urban Mass Transit (Chair: Joseph Minish; Ranking Member: Garry E. Brown) 
 Crime (Select)
 District of Columbia (Chair: Charles Diggs; Ranking Member: Ancher Nelsen) 
 Business, Commerce and Taxation (Chair: W. S. Stuckey Jr.; Ranking Member: Bill Harsha) 
 Education (Chair: Ron Dellums; Ranking Member: Stewart B. McKinney) 
 Government Operations (Chair: Brock Adams; Ranking Member: Earl F. Landgrebe) 
 Judiciary (Chair: Walter Fauntroy; Ranking Member: Henry P. Smith III) 
 Labor, Social Services and the International Community (Chair: Romano Mazzoli; Ranking Member: Gilbert Gude) 
 Revenue and Financial Services (Chair: Thomas M. Rees; Ranking Member: Joel T. Broyhill) 
 Education and Labor (Chair: Carl D. Perkins; Ranking Member: Al Quie) 
 Education (Chair: Carl D. Perkins; Ranking Member: Alphonso Bell)
 Labor  (Chair: Frank Thompson; Ranking Member: John M. Ashbrook)
 Foreign Affairs (Chair: Thomas E. Morgan; Ranking Member: John N. Erlenborn)
 National Security Policy and Scientific Developments (Chair: Clement J. Zablocki; Ranking Member: Marvin L. Esch)
 State Department Organization and Foreign Operations (Chair: Wayne Hays; Ranking Member: Edwin D. Eshleman)
 Inter-American Affairs (Chair: Dante Fascell; Ranking Member: Vernon W. Thomson)
 Africa (Chair: Charles Diggs; Ranking Member: Edward J. Derwinski)
 Asian and Pacific Affairs (Chair: Robert N. C. Nix Sr.; Ranking Member: William S. Broomfield)
 International Organizations and Movements (Chair: Donald M. Fraser; Ranking Member: H. R. Gross)
 Europe (Chair: Benjamin Stanley Rosenthal; Ranking Member: Peter Frelinghuysen)
 Foreign Economic Policy (Chair: John Culver; Ranking Member: J. Herbert Burke)
 Near East and South Asia (Chair: Lee H. Hamilton; Ranking Member: John H. Buchanan Jr.)
 Foreign Aid Programs (Chair: Thomas E. Morgan; Ranking Member: William S. Mailliard)
 Government Operations (Chair: Chester E. Holifield; Ranking Member: Frank Horton)
 Conservation and Natural Resources (Chair: Henry S. Reuss; Ranking Member: Guy Vander Jagt)
 Foreign Operations and Government Information (Chair: William S. Moorhead; Ranking Member: John N. Erlenborn)
 Government Activities (Chair: Jack Brooks; Ranking Member: John H. Buchanan Jr.)
 Intergovernmental Relations (Chair: Lawrence H. Fountain; Ranking Member: Clarence J. Brown)
 Legal and Monetary Affairs (Chair: William J. Randall; Ranking Member: Sam Steiger)
 Legislation and Military Operations (Chair: Chester E. Holifield; Ranking Member: Frank Horton)
 Special Studies (Chair: Floyd Hicks; Ranking Member: John W. Wydler)
 House Administration (Chair: Wayne Hays; Ranking Member: William L. Dickinson)
 Accounts (Chair: Frank Thompson; Ranking Member: Samuel L. Devine)
 Elections (Chair: John Herman Dent; Ranking Member: R. James Harvey)
 Library and Memorials (Chair: Lucien Nedzi; Ranking Member: James C. Cleveland)
 Printing (Chair: John Brademas; Ranking Member: James C. Cleveland)
 Electrical and Mechanical Office Equipment (Chair: Augustus Hawkins; Ranking Member: R. James Harvey)
 Contracts (Chair: Thomas S. Gettys; Ranking Member: James C. Cleveland)
 Police (Chair: Kenneth J. Gray; Ranking Member: Samuel L. Devine)
 Personnel (Chair: Frank Annunzio; Ranking Member: Phil Crane)
 House Beauty Shop (Select) (Chair: Martha W. Griffiths)
 House Restaurant (Select) (Chair: John C. Kluczynski)
 Interior and Insular Affairs (Chair: James A. Haley; Ranking Member: Craig Hosmer)
 Environment (Chair: Mo Udall; Ranking Member: Philip E. Ruppe)
 National Parks and Recreation (Chair: Roy A. Taylor; Ranking Member: Joe Skubitz)
 Water and Power Resources (Chair: Harold T. Johnson; Ranking Member: Craig Hosmer)
 Territorial and Insular Affairs (Chair: Phillip Burton; Ranking Member: Don H. Clausen)
 Indian Affairs (Chair: Lloyd Meeds; Ranking Member: Manuel Lujan Jr.)
 Mines and Mining (Chair: Patsy Mink; Ranking Member: John Newbold Camp)
 Public Lands (Chair: John Melcher; Ranking Member: Sam Steiger)
 Internal Security (Chair: Richard Howard Ichord Jr.; Ranking Member: John M. Ashbrook)
 Interstate and Foreign Commerce (Chair: Harley Orrin Staggers; Ranking Member: Samuel L. Devine)
 Commerce and Finance (Chair: John E. Moss; Ranking Member: Jim Broyhill)
 Communications and Power (Chair: Torbert Macdonald; Ranking Member: Clarence J. Brown)
 Public Health and Environment (Chair: Paul Rogers; Ranking Member: Ancher Nelsen)
 Transportation and Aeronautics (Chair: John Jarman; Ranking Member: R. James Harvey)
 Investigations (Chair: Harley Orrin Staggers; Ranking Member: Samuel L. Devine)
 Judiciary (Chair: Peter W. Rodino; Ranking Member: Edward Hutchinson)
 Civil Rights and Constitutional Rights (Chair: Don Edwards; Ranking Member: Charles E. Wiggins)
 Claims and Governmental Relations (Chair: Harold Donohue; Ranking Member: M. Caldwell Butler)
 Courts, Civil Liberties and the Administration of Justice (Chair: Robert W. Kastenmeier; Ranking Member: M. Caldwell Butler)
 Crime (Chair: John Conyers Jr.)
 Criminal Justice (Chair: William L. Hungate; Ranking Member: Henry P. Smith III)
 Immigration, Citizenship and International Law (Chair: Joshua Eilberg; Ranking Member: Hamilton Fish IV)
 Monopolies and Commercial Law (Chair: Peter W. Rodino Jr.; Ranking Member: Edward Hutchinson)
 Merchant Marine and Fisheries (Chair: Leonor Sullivan; Ranking Member: James R. Grover Jr.)
 Merchant Marine (Chair: Frank M. Clark; Ranking Member: William S. Mailliard)
 Fisheries, Wildlife Conservation and the Environment (Chair: John Dingell; Ranking Member: George A. Goodling)
 Coast Guard and Navigation (Chair: John M. Murphy; Ranking Member: Philip E. Ruppe)
 Oceangraphy (Chair: Thomas N. Downing; Ranking Member: Charles A. Mosher)
 Panama Canal (Chair: Robert L. Leggett; Ranking Member: Gene Snyder)
 Post Office and Civil Service (Chair: Thaddeus J. Dulski; Ranking Member: H.R. Gross)
 Investigations (Chair: Thaddeus J. Dulski; Ranking Member: Walter E. Powell)
 Postal Service (Chair: James M. Hanley; Ranking Member: Albert W. Johnson)
 Retirement and Employee Benefits (Chair: Jerome Waldie; Ranking Member: Lawrence J. Hogan)
 Manpower and Civil Service (Chair: David N. Henderson; Ranking Member: Edward J. Derwinski)
 Postal Facilities, Mail and Labor Management (Chair: Charlie Wilson; Ranking Member: Elwood Hillis)
 Census and Statistics (Chair: Richard Crawford White; Ranking Member: John H. Rousselot)
 Public Works (Chair: John Blatnik; Ranking Member: John H. Rousselot)
 Water Resources (Chair: Ray Roberts; Ranking Member: Bill Harsha)
 Transportation (Chair: John C. Kluczynski; Ranking Member: Don H. Clausen)
 Public Buildings and Grounds (Chair: Kenneth J. Gray; Ranking Member: James R. Grover Jr.)
 Economic Development (Chair: Robert E. Jones Jr.; Ranking Member: John Paul Hammerschmidt)
 Investigations and Review (Chair: Jim Wright; Ranking Member: James C. Cleveland)
 Energy (Chair: James J. Howard; Ranking Member: Gene Snyder)
 Regulate Parking (Select) (Chair: B. F. Sisk)
 Rules (Chair: Ray Madden; Ranking Member: David T. Martin)
 Science and Astronautics (Chair: Olin E. Teague; Ranking Member: Charles A. Mosher)
 Aeronautics and Space Technology (Chair: Ray Madden; Ranking Member: John W. Wydler)
 Science, Research and Development (Chair: John William Davis; Ranking Member: Alphonso Bell)
 Manned Space Flight (Chair: Don Fuqua; Ranking Member: Larry Winn Jr.)
 Space Science and Applications (Chair: James W. Symington; Ranking Member: Marvin L. Esch)
 International Cooperation in Science and Space (Chair: Richard T. Hanna; Ranking Member: Louis Frey)
 Energy (Chair: Mike McCormack; Ranking Member: Barry M. Goldwater)
 Standards of Official Conduct (Chair: Melvin Price; Ranking Member: Jimmy Quillen)
 Small Business (Select) (Chair: Joe L. Evins)
 Veterans' Affairs (Chair: William Jennings Bryan Dorn; Ranking Member: John Paul Hammerschmidt)
 Compensation and Pension (Chair: Olin E. Teague; Ranking Member: John Paul Hammerschmidt)
 Education and Training (Chair: Henry Helstoski; Ranking Member: Margaret M. Heckler)
 Hospitals (Chair: David E. Satterfield III)
 Housing (Chair: Charles J. Carney; Ranking Member: Elwood Hillis)
 Insurance (Chair: Sonny Montgomery; Ranking Member: John M. Zwach)
 Ways and Means (Chair: Wilbur Mills; Ranking Member: Herman T. Schneebeli)
 Whole

Joint committees

 Atomic Energy (Chair: Rep. Charles Melvin Price; Vice Chair: Sen. John O. Pastore)
 Congressional Operations (Chair: Sen. Lee Metcalf; Vice Chair: Rep. Jack Brooks)
 Defense Productions (Chair: Sen. John J. Sparkman; Vice Chair: Rep. Wright Patman)
 Economic (Chair: Rep. Wright Patman; Vice Chair: Sen. William Proxmire)
 Internal Revenue Taxation (Chair: Sen. Russell B. Long; Ranking Member: Rep. Wilbur D. Mills)
 The Library (Chair: Sen. Howard Cannon; Vice Chair: Rep. Lucien N. Nedzi)
 Printing (Chair: Rep. Wayne L. Hays; Vice Chair: Sen. Howard Cannon)
 Reduction of Federal Expenditures (Chair: Rep. George H. Mahon)
 Budget Control (Chair: Rep. Al Ullman)

Employees

Legislative branch agency directors
 Architect of the Capitol: George M. White
 Attending Physician of the United States Congress: Rufus Pearson, until 1974
 Freeman H. Cary, starting 1974
 Comptroller General of the United States: Elmer B. Staats
 Librarian of Congress: Lawrence Quincy Mumford, until 1974
 Public Printer of the United States: Thomas F. McCormick, starting 1973

Senate
 Secretary: Francis R. Valeo
 Librarian: Roger K. Haley
 Parliamentarian: Floyd Riddick, until 1974 
 Murray Zweben, starting 1974
 Sergeant at Arms: William H. Wannall
 Chaplain: Edward L.R. Elson (Presbyterian)
 Curator: James R. Ketchum
 Democratic Party Secretary: J. Stanley Kimmitt
 Republican Party Secretary: J. Mark Trice, until 1974 
 William Hildenbrand, starting 1974

House of Representatives
 Chaplain: Edward G. Latch (Methodist)
 Clerk: W. Pat Jennings 
 Doorkeeper: William M. Miller, until December 31, 1974
 James T. Molloy, interim
 Parliamentarian: Lewis Deschler, until June 27, 1974
 William Holmes Brown, appointed June 27, 1974
 Postmaster: Robert V. Rota
 Reading Clerk: 
 Bob Berry (R)
 Charles W. Hackney Jr. (D)
 Sergeant at Arms: Kenneth R. Harding

See also
 1972 United States elections (elections leading to this Congress)
 1972 United States presidential election
 1972 United States Senate elections
 1972 United States House of Representatives elections
 1974 United States elections (elections during this Congress, leading to the next Congress)
 1974 United States Senate elections
 1974 United States House of Representatives elections

Notes

Footnotes

References
 Biographical Directory of the U.S. Congress
 U.S. House of Representatives: Congressional History
 U.S. Senate: Statistics and Lists